is a Japanese actress and model who is represented by LesPros Entertainment. She is an exclusive model for the magazines Seventeen and Nicola.

Personal 
Seiya Suzuki is one of her friends.

On February 14, 2023, she announced her marriage to a general man through her Instagram.

Discography

Singles

Filmography

Drama

Films

Variety

Bibliography

Magazines

Mook

References

External links
 
Seventeen profile 

Japanese female models
1996 births
Living people
People from Tokyo
21st-century Japanese actresses
Models from Tokyo Metropolis